Idalus panamensis is a moth of the family Erebidae. It was described by William Schaus in 1921. It is found in Panama.

References

panamensis
Moths described in 1921